Sebastian Orby Conran (born 5 April 1956) is a British designer, entrepreneur and inventor.

Early life 

Sebastian Conran was born in London, the son of British designer, restaurateur and retailer Terence Conran and Superwoman author Shirley Conran née Pearce. He is the elder brother of fashion designer Jasper Conran and half brother of Tom, Sophie Conran and Ned.

He was educated at Bryanston School in Dorset, in England, where he became a governor and trustee in 2011. He studied industrial design engineering at the Central School of Art and Design in London from 1974-77. From 1976-77 he worked as a general factotum and roadie with Punk band The Clash, designing clothes, posters, promotional material, record sleeves and stage sets.

Design career 

On graduating in 1978, Conran joined corporate and brand identity consultancyWolff Olins. Three years later he became head of product design at Mothercare.

He established product and brand development consultancySebastian Conran Associates in 1985. From 1999, he headed product and branding design at Studio Conran under Conran & Partners, part of the Conran Group led by his father Sir Terence Conran. In 2009, he re-established the design company Sebastian Conran Associates as managing director, based in west London.

In 2009 Conran co-founded homewares brand Universal Expert for the design and international supply of homewares collections. He has separately collaborated with cooks like Nigella Lawson and Ken Hom to create their own homewares brands and designed products for department store chain
John Lewis.

Other clients have included home appliance company Belling, retailers Marks & Spencer and Sainsbury's, Ford Motor Company and luxury goods company Connolly Leather, among others.

In 2014 he co-founded and became Chief Executive Officer of Consequential Robotics with Professor Tony Prescott and Dr Ben Mitchinson of the University of Sheffield, which brings Sheffield together with the universities of Bristol and Edinburgh.

In 2015 he co-founded robotics wheelchair start-up Indusiviti and remains Design Director.

Since the death of his father in 2020 Conran has been chairman of multidisciplinary design group Conran & Partners and the Conran Foundation, a charity set up in 1980 to promote public education in design aa a way of boosting quality of life.

Academic career 
From 1995-98 Sebastian Conran was visiting lecture in the Furniture department of London's Royal College of Art. From 2008-12 he was Visiting Professor in the Innovation faculty of University of the Arts London and from 2011-17 was Designer in Residence in the Engineering faculty of the University of Sheffield. In 2017 he was appointed Visiting Professor of Design and Innovation at Bristol Robotics Laboratory.

Academic awards 
Sebastian Conran has been awarded the following academic honours:
Fellow of the Institute of Minerals, Materials and Mining
Fellow [hon] of the Royal College of Art
Fellow [hon] of University of the Arts London
Fellow [hon] of Arts University Bournemouth
PhD  Engineering [hon] from University of Sheffield
PhD Technology [hon] from University of Loughborough
PhD Design [hon] from UWE Bristol
PhD Arts [hon] fromHertfordshire University

Honorary roles 
Sebastian Conran is a trustee of the Design Museum in London. and from 2005-9 was a Trustee of educational charity Design and Art Direction.

From 2008-11 he was a Trustee of the UK Design Council Design Council.

He chaired the Design & Technology Alliance, set up by the UK Government to tackle crime through design, from 2007–11 and Innovate UK's Technologies Innovation Network from 2008-2014. He also chaired Innovate UK's Design Special Interest Group from 2013-16.

From 2012-16 he chaired the steering committee of Design in Action Scotland.

Professional organisations 
Sebastian Conran is a Fellow of Royal Society of Arts and of the Chartered Society of Designers.

See also
 Robotic kitchen design.

References 

1956 births
Living people
People educated at Bryanston School
Alumni of the Central School of Art and Design
English designers
People from Westminster
Sebastian